George Bartlett (born 24 October 1968) is an Australian former professional rugby league footballer from the 1990s. A  or er, he played for the Parramatta Eels, North Sydney Bears and North Queensland Cowboys.

Playing career
A Central Coast junior, Bartlett made his first grade debut for the Parramatta Eels in Round 20 of the 1988 NSWRL season. Over four seasons with the Eels, he played just eight games.

In 1992, he joined the North Sydney Bears. He enjoyed his best season to date in 1993, playing 17 games. He left the club at the end of 1994, after just one appearance in first grade.

In 1995, Bartlett joined the newly-established North Queensland Cowboys. He came off the bench in their inaugural game against the Sydney Bulldogs. In Round 8 of the 1995 season, he started at lock in the club's first ever win against the Illawarra Steelers. At the end of the 1996 season, after 27 games for the Cowboys, he retired.

Statistics

NSWRL/ARL

Post-playing career
Following his retirement, Bartlett worked as head coach of the Kirwan State High School rugby league team.
He is now currently the Deputy Principal at Beenleigh State High School in the South-Eastern region of Queensland

References

1968 births
Living people
Australian rugby league players
Parramatta Eels players
North Sydney Bears players
North Queensland Cowboys players
Rugby league second-rows
Rugby league locks
Place of birth missing (living people)